Colin Thomas Johnson (21 August 1938 – 20 January 2019), better known by his nom de plume Mudrooroo, was a novelist, poet, essayist and playwright. He has been described as one of the most enigmatic literary figures of Australia and his many works are centred on Australian Aboriginal characters and Aboriginal topics.

Also known as Mudrooroo Narogin and Mudrooroo Nyoongah. Narogin after the Indigenous spelling for his place of birth, and Nyoongah after the name of the people from whom he claimed descent. Mudrooroo means paperbark in the Bibbulmun language group spoken by the Noongar.

Biography 
Born Colin Johnson, Mudrooroo was separated from his mother (his father had died before he was born) shortly before his ninth birthday. After spending seven years at Clontarf Boys' Town, he was turned out of the institution at the age of sixteen. He turned to burglary and served two stints in Fremantle Prison, where he began writing literature.

After leaving prison, he traveled to India and London before settling in Melbourne. His first novel Wild Cat Falling, a coming-of-age story set in Western Australia, became a bestseller when it was published in 1965.

He then spent periods living in India and the United States, where he finished his novel Long Live Sandawara (published 1979) about the Bunuba resistance hero Jandamarra. After returning to Australia, he took on the name of Mudrooroo. With Jack Davis, he co-founded the National Aboriginal and Islander Writers, Oral Literature, and Dramatists Association. He was also head of Aboriginal Studies at Murdoch University in Perth.

After the 1996 controversy surrounding his Aboriginal identity, Mudrooroo spent fifteen years living in India and Nepal, where he married and had a son. In 2011 he and his family returned to Australia, where he published Balga Boy Jackson (2017) and began work on an (unfinished) autobiography.

Controversy over Aboriginality
In early 1996, a member of the Nyoongah community questioning Mudrooroo's Aboriginality approached journalist Victoria Laurie. Informed that Mudrooroo's oldest sister, Betty Polglaze, had conducted genealogical research in 1992 that traced some (although not all) of her family back five generations, Laurie contacted Polglaze. Polglaze, who identified as a white person, told Laurie that she could find no trace of Aboriginal ancestry in the family. Laurie subsequently wrote an article for her newspaper titled Identity Crisis sparking a scandal that received nationwide media coverage in 1996/97.

A request by the Nyoongah community to substantiate his claimed kinship to the Kickett family was not acknowledged because he was overseas and then in the process of relocating interstate. On 27 July 1996 the Nyoongah elders released a public statement: "The Kickett family rejects Colin Johnson's claim to his Aboriginality and any kinship ties to the family". Mudrooroo's prior statements about Indigenous writers such as Sally Morgan, whom he excluded from his definition of Aboriginality, did not assist his cause. He had said of Morgan's book My Place that it made Aboriginality acceptable so long as you were "young, gifted and not very black." Mudrooroo's writings had placed emphasis on kinship and family links as key features of Aboriginal identity. His rejection of his biological family deeply offended some in the Aboriginal community.

The resulting scandal and public debate over issues of authenticity and what constitutes Aboriginal identity led to some subject coordinators removing Mudrooroo's books from academic courses and he later said he was unable to find a publisher for a sequel to his previous novel. Initially, many people came to Mudrooroo's defence, some claiming it was a "white conspiracy" or a racist attack on Aboriginality with some claiming Polglaze's "amateur sleuthing" was being exploited. Award-winning Indigenous author Graeme Dixon called on Mudrooroo to come forward and tell the truth, stressing that it was important to "out" pretenders and reclaim Aboriginal culture. Several authors see evidence in his writings that Mudrooroo deliberately assumed an Aboriginal identity to legitimise his work when in his early 20s, although it remains possible he was unaware.  Editor Gerhard Fischer believes that it was Dame Mary Durack, though not Aboriginal herself, who "defined and determined" his Aboriginal identity. In an article published in 1997, Mudrooroo described Durack's foreword to his first novel as the origin of the "re-writing of his body" as Aboriginal. Mudrooroo later replied to his critics, stating that his dark skin meant he was always treated as Aboriginal by society, therefore his life experience was that of an Aborigine. Johnson moved to Kapan, Nepal in 2001 following the controversy and died in Brisbane in 2019.

Bibliography
 Wild Cat Falling (Sydney: Angus & Robertson, 1965; Harmondsworth, U.K.: Penguin, 1966)
 Long Live Sandawara (Melbourne: Quartet Books, 1979)
 Before the Invasion: Aboriginal Life to 1788, by Mudrooroo, Colin Bourke, and Isobel White (Melbourne &London: Oxford University Press, 1980; Melbourne & New York: Oxford University Press, 1980);
 Doctor Wooreddy's Prescription for Enduring the Ending of the World (Melbourne: Hyland House, 1983 and New York: Ballantine, 1983)
 The Song Circle of Jacky: And Selected Poems (Melbourne: Hyland House, 1986)
 Dalwurra: The Black Bittern, A Poem Cycle, edited by Veronica Brady and Susan Miller (Nedlands: Centre for Studies in Australian Literature, University of Western Australia, 1988)
 Doin Wildcat: A Novel Koori Script As Constructed by Mudrooroo (Melbourne: Hyland House, 1988)
 Writing from the Fringe: A Study of Modern Aboriginal Literature in Australia (South Yarra, Vic.: Hyland House, 1990)
 Master of the Ghost Dreaming: A Novel (Sydney: Angus & Robertson, 1991)
 The Garden of Gethsemane: Poems from the Lost Decade (South Yarra, Vic.: Hyland House, 1991)
 Wildcat Screaming: A Novel (Pymble, N.S.W.: Angus & Robertson, 1992)
 The Kwinkan (Pymble, N.S.W.: Angus & Robertson 1993)
 Aboriginal Mythology: An A-Z Spanning the History of the Australian Aboriginal Peoples from the Earliest Legends to the Present Day (London: Aquarian, 1994)
 Us Mob: History, Culture, Struggle: An Introduction to Indigenous Australia. (Sydney & London: Angus & Robertson, 1995)
 Pacific Highway Boo-Blooz: Country Poems (St. Lucia: University of Queensland Press, 1996)
 The Indigenous Literature of Australia: Milli Milli Wangka (South Melbourne, Vic.: Hyland House, 1997)
 The Undying (Pymble, N.S.W.: Angus & Robertson, 1998)
 Underground (Pymble, N.S.W.: Angus & Robertson, 1999)
 The Promised Land (Pymble, N.S.W.. Angus & Robertson, 2000)
 Edition: Wild Cat Falling, Imprint Classics edition, introduction by Stephen Muecke (Pymble, N.S.W.: Angus & Robertson, 1992)

Editorials and essays
 Struggling, a novella, in Paperbark: A Collection of Black Australian Writings, edited by J. Davis, S. Muecke, Mudrooroo, and A. Shoemaker (University of Queensland Press, 1990), pp. 199–290
 The Mudrooroo/Müller Project: A Theatrical Casebook, edited by Gerhard Fischer, Paul Behrendt, and Brian Syron—comprises The Aboriginal Protestors Confront
 The Declaration of the Australian Republic on 26 January 2001 with the Production of The Commission by Heiner Müller (Sydney: New South Wales University Press, 1993)
 Tell Them You're Indian, An Afterword, in Race Matters: Indigenous Australians and "Our" Society, ed. By Gillian Cowlishaw & Barry Morris (Canberra: Aboriginal Studies P, 1997)

Sources
Maureen Clark Mudrooroo: a likely story : identity and belonging in postcolonial Australia Peter Lang (publishers) 2007 

Mudrooroo: A Critical Study, by Adam Shoemaker (Sydney: Angus & Robertson, 1993);

Mongrel Signatures, Reflections on the Work of Mudrooroo, ed. By Annalisa Oboe (Cross Cultures 64, Amsterdam-New York, Rodopi, 2003).

The Work of Mudrooroo: thirty-one years of literary production, 1960–1991: a comprehensive listing of primary materials (including unpublished work) with secondary sources, compiled by Hugh Webb. Perth, SPAN: Journal of the South Pacific Association for Commonwealth Literature and Language Studies, ed. By Kathryn Trees. Number 33 (1992).

References

External links
 Author's homepage Waybackmachine Archive

1938 births
2019 deaths
20th-century Australian novelists
Australian male novelists
Australian non-fiction writers
Australian literary critics
Australian poets
People from Narrogin, Western Australia
Australian male poets
20th-century Australian male writers
Male non-fiction writers